Rhantus is a genus of beetle in family Dytiscidae. There are about 100 species distributed worldwide. They often live in pools and marshy habitat types. Several species have colonized oceanic islands and become endemics.

This genus is paraphyletic and will likely be revised, redefined, and split into several groups in future studies. As a result of research published in 2017 by Balke et al., 17 species were moved from Rhantus to the genera Nartus, Meridiorhantus, Caperhantus, and Carabdytes.

Species

These species belong to the genus Rhantus:

 Rhantus advena Sharp, 1882
 Rhantus alluaudi Peschet, 1910
 Rhantus andinus Balke, 1998
 Rhantus anggi Balke, 2001
 Rhantus anisonychus Crotch, 1873
 Rhantus annectens Sharp, 1882
 Rhantus atricolor (Aubé, 1838)
 Rhantus bacchusi Balke, 2001
 Rhantus binotatus (Harris, 1828)
 Rhantus bistriatus (Bergsträsser, 1778)
 Rhantus blancasi Guignot, 1955
 Rhantus bohlei Balke, Roughley, Sondermann & Spangler, 2002
 Rhantus bouvieri Régimbart, 1900
 Rhantus bula Balke, Wewalka, Alarie & Ribera, 2007
 Rhantus calileguai Trémouilles, 1984
 Rhantus capensis (Aubé, 1838)
 Rhantus cheesmanae Balke, 1993
 Rhantus colymbitoides Gschwendtner, 1932
 Rhantus concolorans (Wallengren, 1881)
 Rhantus consimilis Motschulsky, 1859
 Rhantus consputus (Sturm, 1834)
 Rhantus crypticus Balke, 1992
 Rhantus dani Balke, 2001
 Rhantus debilis Sharp, 1882
 Rhantus discicollis (Aubé, 1838)
 Rhantus duponti (Aubé, 1838)
 Rhantus ekari Balke & Hendrich, 1992
 Rhantus elegans C.O. Waterhouse, 1895
 Rhantus elisabethae Balke, Kinibel & Sagata, 2007
 Rhantus englundi Balke & Ramsdale, 2006
 Rhantus erraticus Sharp, 1884
 Rhantus exsoletus (Forster, 1771)
 Rhantus fengi Zhao, Jia & Balke, 2011
 Rhantus fennicus Huldén, 1982
 Rhantus formosanus Kamiya, 1938
 Rhantus franzi Balke, 1998
 Rhantus friedrichi Falkenström, 1936
 Rhantus frontalis (Marsham, 1802)
 Rhantus galapagoensis Balke & Peck, 1993
 Rhantus gogonensis Wewalka, 1975
 Rhantus gutticollis (Say, 1830)
 Rhantus hiekei Balke, 1993
 Rhantus hispanicus Sharp, 1882
 Rhantus includens (Walker, 1871)
 Rhantus incognitus Scholz, 1927
 Rhantus interclusus (Walker, 1858)
 Rhantus intermedius Balke, 1993
 Rhantus kakapupu Balke, 2001
 Rhantus kini Balke, Wewalka, Alarie & Ribera, 2007
 Rhantus latitans Sharp, 1882
 Rhantus latus (Fairmaire, 1869)
 Rhantus leuser Balke, 1998
 Rhantus liopteroides Zimmermann, 1927
 Rhantus longulus Régimbart, 1895
 Rhantus manjakatompo Pederzani & Rocchi, 2009
 Rhantus notaticollis (Aubé, 1837)
 Rhantus obscuricollis (Aubé, 1838)
 Rhantus ovalis Gschwendtner, 1936
 Rhantus papuanus J. Balfour-Browne, 1939
 Rhantus pederzanii Toledo & Mazzoldi, 1996
 Rhantus peruvianus Guignot, 1955
 Rhantus phocaenarum Guignot, 1957
 Rhantus riedeli Balke, 2001
 Rhantus rohani Peschet, 1924
 Rhantus rufus Zimmermann, 1922
 Rhantus rugulosus Régimbart, 1899
 Rhantus schauinslandi Ordish, 1989
 Rhantus schereri Balke, 1990
 Rhantus selkirki Jäch, Balke & Michat, 2014
 Rhantus sericans Sharp, 1882
 Rhantus sexualis Zimmermann, 1919
 Rhantus signatus (Fabricius, 1775)
 Rhantus sikkimensis Régimbart, 1899
 Rhantus simulans Régimbart, 1908
 Rhantus socialis (C.O. Waterhouse, 1876)
 Rhantus souzannae Balke, 1990
 Rhantus supranubicus Balke, 2001
 Rhantus suturalis (W.S. Macleay, 1825)
 Rhantus suturellus (Harris, 1828)
 Rhantus taprobanicus Sharp, 1890
 Rhantus thibetanus Régimbart, 1899
 Rhantus tigris Balke, 1995
 Rhantus tristanicola (Brinck, 1948)
 Rhantus vermiculatus Motschulsky, 1860
 Rhantus vicinus (Aubé, 1838)
 Rhantus vinsoni Balke, 1992
 Rhantus vitiensis J. Balfour-Browne, 1944
 Rhantus wallisi Hatch, 1953
 Rhantus wittei Gschwendtner, 1938
 Rhantus yessoensis Sharp, 1891
 † Rhantus praesuturellus Nomnicki, 1894

References

 
Taxonomy articles created by Polbot
Dytiscidae genera